Turkmenistan sent a delegation to compete at the 2008 Summer Paralympics in Beijing, China. The country was represented by three athletes, all competing in powerlifting.

Powerlifting

Men

Women

See also
Turkmenistan at the Paralympics
Turkmenistan at the 2008 Summer Olympics

References

External links
International Paralympic Committee

Nations at the 2008 Summer Paralympics
2008
Summer Paralympics